Validation is a legal process in the United States where criminal justice authorities (prison officials, parole officers, police officers, or prosecutors) designate that a person is a member of a gang.  Once a person is validated as a gang member, the person is subject to increased sentences, harsher punishments (such as solitary confinement) and more restrictive parole rules.

To validate a person as a gang member, the officials generally must provide evidence of several factors, such as tattoos, photographs, admissions, clothing, etc.  The list of criteria for the state of California is found in California Code of Regulations Title 15, Article 10 3375.3 and 3378.2.

The legal requirements for validating a person are much lower than the requirements for convicting of a crime.

Film and television 

 Shot Caller (2017 film)  The main character, Jacob Harlon, played by Nikolaj Coster-Waldau is validated by law enforcement as being a member of a gang in one of the final scenes.

References

Gangs in the United States
Prison gangs in the United States
Penal system in the United States